The 2021–22 ASUN Conference men's basketball season started non-conference play on November 9, 2021, and began conference play on January 4, 2022. The regular season ended on February 26, 2022, followed by the 2022 ASUN men's basketball tournament held March 1–8, 2022.

The conference's regular season champions, the Jacksonville State Gamecocks, were awarded the conference's automatic bid to the 2022 NCAA Division I men's basketball tournament. The conference tournament was won by the Bellarmine Knights, who were ineligible for the NCAA tournament due to their transitional status moving from NCAA Division II to NCAA Division I.

Conference changes 

Due to the offseason additions of Central Arkansas, Eastern Kentucky, and Jacksonville State, the ASUN changed the conference play format. The conference was split into East and West Divisions. The East includes Florida Gulf Coast, Jacksonville, Kennesaw State, Liberty, North Florida and Stetson, while the West features Bellarmine, Central Arkansas, Eastern Kentucky, Jacksonville State, Lipscomb and North Alabama. Conference play consists of 96 total games, with each team playing 16 games. Each team plays home-and-home against the other teams in its own division, and single games against teams from the other division evenly split between home and away games.

Head coaches

Coaching changes 
Jacksonville hired Jordan Mincy after Tony Jasick was fired after going 11–13.

Coaches 

Notes:

 Year at school includes 2021–22 season.
 Overall and ASUN records are from the time at current school and are through the end of the 2020–21 season.
 NCAA Tournament appearances are from the time at current school only, and refer solely to Division I. Before Ballarmine started its transition to Division I, Scott Davenport had led the Knights to 12 Division II tournament appearances.

Preseason Awards 
The ASUN preseason men's basketball poll was released on October 20, 2021.

Preseason men's basketball polls

Coaches Poll 
First Place Votes in Parenthesis

 Liberty (9) - 141
 Eastern Kentucky (1) - 126
 Jacksonville State - 103
 Bellarmine (1) - 97
 Lipscomb - 89
 Florida Gulf Coast - 88
North Florida (1) - 82
Stetson - 67
North Alabama - 49
Jacksonville - 40
Kennesaw State - 37
Central Arkansas - 17

Media Poll 
First Place Votes in Parenthesis

 Liberty (30) - 276
 Eastern Kentucky (2) - 288
 Bellarmine / Lipscomb - 284

 Jacksonville State - 240
 North Florida - 230
Florida Gulf Coast - 200
Stetson - 176
North Alabama - 174
Jacksonville - 94
Central Arkansas - 80
Kennesaw State - 0

Preseason Honors 

*unanimous selection

Regular season

Conference standings

Conference Matrix

Players of the Week

Records against other conferences

Conference tournament 

The 2022 ASUN Tournament was held at the higher seeded team's home court from March 1, 2022 to March 8, 2022.

References